Tribulation are a Swedish heavy metal band from Arvika that formed in 2005. In early 2009, the band released its debut studio album The Horror. Their second full-length studio album The Formulas of Death was released in 2013. In 2015, they released their third full-length studio album Children of the Night which showed a departure from the death metal sound of their first two albums, drawing significantly on traditional heavy metal, black metal, psychedelic rock, gothic rock, as well as the occult and supernatural mythology.

Members 
Current members
Johannes Andersson – bass, vocals 
Adam Zaars – guitars 
Oscar Leander – drums 
Joseph Tholl – guitars 

Past members
Jonathan Hultén – guitars 
Jakob Johansson – drums 
Jakob Ljungberg – drums

Timeline

Discography

Studio albums 
The Horror (2009)
The Formulas of Death (2013)
The Children of the Night (2015)
Down Below (2018)
Where the Gloom Becomes Sound (2021)

EPs 
 Melancholia (2016)
 Lady Death (2017)
 Hamartia (2023)

Live albums 
Alive & Dead at Södra Teatern (2019)

References

External links 

 

2005 establishments in Sweden
Extreme metal musical groups
Musical groups established in 2005
Musical quartets
Occult rock musical groups
Swedish black metal musical groups
Swedish death metal musical groups